Henri Eugène Alexandre Plocque (3 June 1873 – 28 September 1914) was a French equestrian. He competed in the equestrian long jump event at the 1900 Summer Olympics.

Personal life
Plocque served as a caporal (corporal) in the 27th Territorial Infantry Regiment of the French Army during the First World War. He was killed in action in Somme on 28 September 1914.

References

External links

1873 births
1914 deaths
French male equestrians
Olympic equestrians of France
Equestrians at the 1900 Summer Olympics
French military personnel killed in World War I
French Army soldiers